The Journal of Virological Methods is a monthly peer-reviewed scientific journal covering techniques on all aspects of virology. The journal was established in 1980. According to the Journal Citation Reports, the journal has a 2020 impact factor of 2.014.

References

External links

English-language journals
Virology journals
Monthly journals
Publications established in 1980
Elsevier academic journals